Arizona State Route 74 (SR 74), locally known as the Carefree Highway, is a state highway in central Arizona that stretches east to west from its junction with U.S. Route 60 (US 60) just south of Wickenburg to its junction with Interstate 17 (I-17) in North Phoenix. It serves Lake Pleasant Regional Park and serves as a northern bypass around the often congested stretches of US 60 through the northwest suburbs of the Phoenix metropolitan area.

The Carefree Highway is the inspiration for a 1974 Gordon Lightfoot song of the same name.

Route description
Stretches of the highway are known as the Morristown-New River Highway, Lake Pleasant Highway, and Carefree Highway, the last of which actually extends  past I-17 to Tom Darlington Drive in Carefree. This stretch of Carefree Highway is sometimes numbered as SR 74 on maps, but is not actually part of the state highway system.

This route offers good views of undeveloped desert landscapes, especially of large saguaro and other desert plants. It is frequently used as an alternate route to US 60 (Grand Avenue) between Phoenix and Wickenburg for motorists traveling to and from Las Vegas, Nevada, with fewer traffic signals than using US 60 directly.

History
From 1927 to 1931, SR 74 was assigned from Wickenburg west to Ehrenberg; this stretch of highway was renumbered as part of U.S. Route 60 (US 60). In 1962, SR 74 was assigned to a new planned alignment, to be built from New River southwest to Morristown. The leg east of Lake Pleasant Regional Park was originally planned to angle northeast away from its current alignment towards New River. But by 1974, the highway heading eastbound abruptly ended southeast of Lake Pleasant, at Lake Pleasant Road and the Carefree Highway; that same year, Carefree Highway between SR 74 and I-17 was designated SR 74T (Temporary 74). On October 18, 1989, the "Temporary" banner was officially removed from the Carefree Highway leg.

Future
The passage of a sales tax extension by voters in Maricopa County in 2004 provided significant funding for highway improvements throughout the region. The Arizona Department of Transportation (ADOT) will use a portion of that funding to acquire right-of-way along SR 74 for future improvements, but has no plans to upgrade the highway to a controlled access freeway until sometime after 2025.

ADOT is also in the planning stages for a bypass around Wickenburg. This bypass would effectively continue SR 74 beyond its current western terminus with US 60 to connect to the planned alignment of future I-11. Whether this bypass would be marked as SR 74 or not is undetermined.

Major intersections

See also

References

External links

SR 74 at Arizona Roads

074
Transportation in Maricopa County, Arizona
Transportation in Phoenix, Arizona
U.S. Route 60